Lester Cort Belding (December 5, 1900 – May 27, 1965) was an American athlete and coach in football and track and field.  He was the first football player from the University of Iowa to be named an All-American.  He was inducted into the National Association of Intercollegiate Athletics Hall of Fame in 1963.

Early years
A native of Mason City, Iowa, Belding was a star football player for Mason City High School from 1914 to 1917.

University of Iowa

Football
Belding enrolled at the University of Iowa where he played football for legendary coach Howard Jones.  He was a consensus Football All-American at the end position in 1919, the first player from the University of Iowa to receive the honor.  Considered "one of the nation's premier collegiate pass catchers of his era," he played on the undefeated 1921 national championship team that outscored opponents 123–15 and included Gordon Locke, Aubrey Devine, Glenn Devine, and Duke Slater.  He was also a three-time first-team All-Big Ten Conference selection.

Track
Belding was also the captain of Iowa's track team in 1921, competing in the 100 and 220-yard dashes.

Coach and athletic director
After graduating from Iowa in 1922, Belding became a coach.  He coached at a prep school in Boulder, Colorado.  In 1923, Belding accepted a coaching position in Clinton, Iowa, where he coached two state championship football teams.  He next accepted a position at the freshman coach at the University of North Carolina.  He later served as the high school coach at Greensboro, North Carolina for seven years.  In 1933, Belding returned to Iowa where he was put in charge of high school athletics at Reinbeck, Iowa.  From 1934 to 1945, he was the athletic director and head football and basketball coach at Dakota Wesleyan College in Mitchell, South Dakota.  He finished his career serving 20 years, from 1945 to 1965, as a track and football coach and athletic director at North Central College in Naperville, Illinois.  in 1963, Belding was inducted into the National Association of Intercollegiate Athletics Hall of Fame.

Belding died of a heart attack in 1965 at age 64.  He was posthumously inducted into the University of Iowa Athletics Hall of Fame in 1991.

Head coaching record

College football

College basketball

References

External links

1900 births
1965 deaths
American football ends
Basketball coaches from Iowa
Dakota Wesleyan Tigers athletic directors
Dakota Wesleyan Tigers football coaches
Dakota Wesleyan Tigers men's basketball coaches
Iowa Hawkeyes football players
Iowa Hawkeyes men's track and field athletes
North Carolina Tar Heels football coaches
North Central Cardinals athletic directors
North Central Cardinals men's basketball coaches
North Central Cardinals football coaches
Rock Island Independents players
College track and field coaches in the United States
High school football coaches in Colorado
All-American college football players
People from Mason City, Iowa
Players of American football from Iowa
High school football coaches in Iowa